The 1964 Bulgarian Cup Final was the 24th final of the Bulgarian Cup (in this period the tournament was named Cup of the Soviet Army), and was contested between Slavia Sofia and Botev Plovdiv on 9 September 1964 at Vasil Levski National Stadium in Sofia. Slavia won the final 3–2.

Match

Details

See also
1963–64 A Group

References

Bulgarian Cup finals
Botev Plovdiv matches
PFC Slavia Sofia matches
Cup Final